The Malayan whistling thrush or Malaysian whistling-thrush (Myophonus robinsoni) is a species of bird in the family Muscicapidae. It is endemic to the Malay Peninsula.  Due primarily to habitat loss, its population is thought to be in decline.

Taxonomy
The Malayan whistling thrush was collected by H. C. Robinson and described as Myiophoneus robinsoni by William Robert Ogilvie-Grant in 1905. The specific name is derived from Robinson's surname.

Distribution and habitat
Its natural habitat is montane forests. It is usually found near streams. The Malayan whistling thrush historically ranged from the Cameron Highlands to the Genting Highlands. It was present in the Cameron Highlands, where it was trapped in the 1950s and 1960s, but a further survey in 2009–2010 failed to find it there, bringing into question the reliability of intermediate sightings; it is possible that there may have been confusion with the subspecies dicrorhynchus of the blue whistling thrush (Myophonus caeruleus). Since 1980, it has been trapped and recorded with certainty only in Fraser's Hill.

Description
The species is monotypic. The male is mostly black-blue. Parts of the head are deep purplish-blue. There is a patch of metallic blue in the lesser coverts. The male and female are very similar. The female is slightly browner and slightly smaller. The juvenile is sootier.

Behaviour and ecology
Its call is a tseee. Its song contains "fluty and scratchy notes". Its diet is probably insects. Breeding has been observed in March and September. The clutch size is 1–2 eggs. The eggs are bluish-grey with pinkish-brown specks. The nest is built of dried plant material and is in a half-cup shape.

Status
The species's population is estimated at 2500–9999 mature and 3500–15000 total individuals. The population is suspected to be decreasing. The species has areas of undisturbed habitat, but may be threatened by habitat destruction and degradation caused by conversion of forest to agricultural land, water pollution, invasive species and overdevelopment. Because the species may have a small range and a small population, the IUCN Red List of Threatened Species has listed it as near threatened.

References

Notes

Citations

Further reading

Malayan whistling thrush
Birds of the Malay Peninsula
Endemic fauna of Malaysia
Taxa named by William Robert Ogilvie-Grant
Malayan whistling thrush
Taxonomy articles created by Polbot